Morus may refer to:

People
 Alexander Morus (1616–1670), Franco-Scottish Protestant preacher
 Henryk Moruś (1943–2013), Polish serial killer
 Huw Morus (1622–1709), Welsh poet 
 Thomas More or Morus (1478–1535), English philosopher
 Morus Clynnog (c. 1525–1581), Welsh Roman Catholic priest and recusant exile
 Morus Dwyfach (fl. c. 1523–1590), Welsh-language poet
 Morus Hasratyan (1902–1979), Armenian historian and philologist
 Moors, Mōrus in late Latin, people of the Maghreb region

Other uses
 Morus (plant), a genus of trees in the family Moraceae commonly known as mulberries
 Morus (bird), a genus of seabirds in the family Sulidae commonly known as gannets
 Moros, the personified spirit of impending doom in Greek mythology
 Latin for morula, an early-stage embryo consisting of 16 cells
 Museum of Reclaimed Urban Space

See also
 Moris (disambiguation)

Genus disambiguation pages
Masculine given names